The 2010–11 Dutch Basketball League season was the 51st season of the Dutch Basketball League, the highest professional basketball league in the Netherlands. Zorg en Zekerheid Leiden won the national championship by beating GasTerra Flames 4-3 in the finals. The season was decided in game seven in the Vijf Meihal in Leiden. After three overtimes, Leiden won the championship over the Flames.

Teams 

All teams from the 2009–10 season played again this season.

Regular season

Playoffs

Awards

All-Star Game

References 

Dutch Basketball League seasons
1
Netherlands